Burundian may refer to:
 Something of, from, or related to the country of Burundi
 A person from Burundi, or of Burundian descent. For information about the Burundian people, see Demographics of Burundi and Culture of Burundi. For specific Burundians, see List of Burundians.
 Note that the Burundian language is called Rundi or Kirundi

See also 
 

Language and nationality disambiguation pages